KOYM may refer to:

 St. Marys Municipal Airport (ICAO code KOYM)
 KOYM-LP, a low-power radio station (99.7 FM) licensed to serve Houston, Texas, United States